Belden is a ghost town located in Sikes Township in Mountrail County, North Dakota, United States. It is located along North Dakota Highway 8 between Stanley and the former town of Van Hook. The village was founded in 1904, and was reportedly named for W. L. Belden, North Dakota's Indian agent at-large who was stationed at Fort Berthold Indian Reservation at the time.

History
Belden was founded in 1904 by Finnish settlers when the area was still part of Ward County. The village never exceeded a population of more than 25. The post office was established in 1904 as well, and operated continuously until 1986 with the ZIP code of 58715. The Belden Store was considered a local landmark. Today, Belden has a population of about 15, with one large family growing the number over the past decade.

Similarly named places in North Dakota
 Belden Post Office (first), Logan County. This post office was reportedly established June 28, 1890, but the government denied the entry with a "no papers" explanation in 1892.
 Belden Post Office (second), Logan County. Named for W. L. Belden or Belden, Nebraska. The post office in Richville, established February 1892, was briefly changed to Belden in April of that year. However, the name change was never formally ratified and was rescinded in 1895.
 Cannon Ball Junction, Sioux County. Located at the junction of the Milwaukee Railroad and Northern Pacific Railroad, it was originally named Belden for W. L. Belden.

References

Finnish-American culture in North Dakota
Ghost towns in North Dakota
Populated places in Mountrail County, North Dakota
Populated places established in 1904
1904 establishments in North Dakota
Mountrail County, North Dakota